Ash-Shurajah is a sub-district located in the Jabal Habashi District, Taiz Governorate, Yemen. Ash-Shurajah had a population of 15,371 according to the 2004 census.

References 

Sub-districts in Jabal Habashi District